Simon Tseko Nkoli (26 November 1957 – 30 November 1998) was an anti-apartheid, gay rights and AIDS activist in South Africa.

Nkoli was born in Soweto in a seSotho-speaking family. Nkoli became a youth activist against apartheid, joining the Congress of South African Students (COSAS) and with the United Democratic Front.

Activism

After joining COSAS in 1980, Nkoli became secretary for the Transvaal division of the group. Despite some resistance from within COSAS, he was allowed keep this position after his sexuality was revealed to the group.

In 1983, he joined the mainly white Gay Association of South Africa (GASA). GASA maintained that it was "apolitical", and refused to support Nkoli's activism on race-related issues. In a 1985 letter sent from prison after his arrest Nkoli told his partner, Roy Shepherd, that "GASA has done nothing for me since I was arrested", though he wrote in the same letter that "some individual members of GASA are seeing me", and that "I will remain a member of Gasa always". The following year, he wrote that he was "absolutely mad to read about me being arrested on 'irrelevant' issues to gay related matters", and increasingly frustrated at a lack of support from GASA. In April 1987, he wrote: "I am not interested in Gasa at all. In fact I am no longer a member of Gasa – or I shall not be a member of Gasa again." Although some sources claim that Nkoli was ejected from GASA after his arrest and trial. He later formed the Saturday Group, the first black gay group in Africa.

Nkoli spoke at rallies in support of rent-boycotts in the Vaal townships and in 1984 he was arrested and faced the death penalty for treason with twenty-one other political leaders in the Delmas Treason Trial, including Popo Molefe and Patrick Lekota, collectively known as the Delmas 22. By coming out while a prisoner, he helped change the attitude of the African National Congress to gay rights. He was acquitted and released from prison in 1988.

He founded the Gay and Lesbian Organisation of the Witwatersrand (GLOW) in 1988. Along with LGBT activist, Beverley Palesa Ditsie, he organised the first pride parade in South Africa held in 1990. He travelled widely and was given several human rights awards in Europe and North America. He was a member of International Lesbian and Gay Association board, representing the African region.

Nkoli was one of the first gay activists to meet with President Nelson Mandela in 1994. He helped in the campaign for the inclusion of protection from discrimination in the Bill of Rights in the 1994 South African constitution and for the repeal of the sodomy law, which happened in May 1998 in his last months.

After becoming one of the first publicly HIV-positive African gay men, he initiated the Positive African Men group based in central Johannesburg. He had been infected with HIV for around 12 years, and had been seriously ill, on and off, for the last four. He died of AIDS in 1998 in Johannesburg.

Personal life

Nkoli was one of four children. Although he was born in Soweto, his parents separated early in his life, and Nkoli was sent to live with his grandparents on a farm in the Orange Free State. He lived there for several years before returning to live with his mother in Sebokeng.

Nkoli met his partner, Roy Shepherd, at the age of 19. He later recalled meeting him at the GCC, or Gay Christian Community.  A collection of their letters, written during Nkoli's trial and imprisonment, was published as part of the GALA Queer Archive under the title Till the Time of Trial: The Prison Letters of Simon Nkoli. Excerpts from these letters were also published in the book Yes, I Am!: Writing by South African Gay Men.

Honours

There is a Simon Nkoli Day in San Francisco. He opened the first Gay Games in New York and was made a freeman of that city by mayor David Dinkins. In 1996 Nkoli was given the Stonewall Award in the Royal Albert Hall in London. Canadian filmmaker John Greyson made a short film about Nkoli titled A Moffie Called Simon in 1987. Nkoli was the subject of Robert Colman's 2003 play, "Your Loving Simon" and Beverley Ditsie's 2002 film "Simon & I".
John Greyson's 2009 film Fig Trees, a hybrid documentary/opera includes reference to Nkoli's activism. In addition, Nkoli's account of coming out as a black gay activist in South Africa is included as a chapter in Mark Gevisser's and Edwin Cameron's Defiant Desire: Gay and Lesbian Lives in South Africa (1994) pages 249–257.

References

 Sunday Times, South Africa - Sunday, 6 December 1998
 Excerpts from: Aldrich R. & Wotherspoon G., Who's Who in Contemporary Gay and Lesbian History, from WWII to Present Day, Routledge, London, 2001

External links
 Biography
 Obituary
 Simon and I - Film by Beverley Palesa Ditsie at the IMDb
 Article about play "Your Loving Simon"
 groups.msn.com

See also 
 HIV/AIDS in South Africa
 Joel Gustave Nana Ngongang

1998 deaths
1957 births
HIV/AIDS activists
South African activists
South African Sotho people
People from Soweto
South African gay men
South African LGBT rights activists
Youth activists
AIDS-related deaths in South Africa
People acquitted of treason
Anti-apartheid activists
20th-century South African LGBT people